"Ghostbusters" is a song written by Ray Parker Jr. as the theme to the film of the same name, and included on the film's soundtrack. Debuting at number 68 on June 16, 1984, the song peaked at No. 1 on the Billboard Hot 100 on August 11, staying there for three weeks (Parker Jr.'s only number one on that chart), and at No. 2 on the UK Singles Chart on September 16, staying there for three weeks. The song reentered the UK Top 75 on November 2, 2008 at No. 49 and again on November 5, 2021, at No. 38.

The song was nominated at the 57th Academy Awards for Best Original Song but lost to Stevie Wonder's "I Just Called to Say I Love You". A lawsuit accusing Parker of basing the song's melody on Huey Lewis and the News's song "I Want a New Drug" resulted in Lewis receiving a settlement.

Background
Parker was approached by the film's producers to create a theme song, although he only had a few days to do so and the film's title seemed impossible to include in any lyrics. However, when watching television late at night, Parker saw a cheap commercial for a local service that reminded him that the film had a similar commercial featured for the fictional business. This inspired him to write the song as a pseudo-advertising jingle that the business could have commissioned as a promotion.

Lindsey Buckingham, on his interview disc Words & Music [A Retrospective], stated that he was approached to write the Ghostbusters theme based on his successful contribution to National Lampoon's Vacation, "Holiday Road". He declined the opportunity as he did not want to be known as a soundtrack artist. Glenn Hughes and Pat Thrall also submitted a demo that was ultimately rejected. The Hughes and Thrall version was later rewritten and used as the track "Dance or Die" for the 1987 film Dragnet.

The theme is estimated to have added $20 million to the film's box-office gross.

Music video
The music video for the song was directed by Ivan Reitman, who also directed the Ghostbusters film, and produced by Jeffrey Abelson. It features a young woman played by actress Cindy Harrell who is haunted by a ghost portrayed by Parker, roaming a nearly all-black house interior (with vibrant neon designs outlining the sparse architectural and industrial features) until the woman finally calls the service. 

Directed by Reitman, the "Ghostbusters" music video was No. 1 on MTV and features cameos by celebrities Chevy Chase, Irene Cara, John Candy, Melissa Gilbert, Ollie E. Brown, Jeffrey Tambor, George Wendt, Al Franken, Danny DeVito, Carly Simon, Peter Falk and Teri Garr. None of the actors were paid for participating but did so as a favor to Reitman. 

The video concludes with Parker and the stars of the film, in full Ghostbuster costume, dancing down the streets of New York City. Times Square was closed in order to film the scene, although a sizable crowd may still be seen in the background. The Ghostbusters also perform the same dance in the closing credits to The Real Ghostbusters cartoon series, as well as in a trailer for the 2009 Ghostbusters video game.

Lawsuit

Shortly after the film's release, Huey Lewis sued Ray Parker Jr. for plagiarism, alleging that Parker had copied the melody (primarily the bassline) from Lewis's 1983 song "I Want a New Drug". The case was settled out of court in 1985 for an undisclosed sum and a confidentiality agreement that prohibited discussion of the case. According to Parker, there were several lawsuits at the time, because "when you sell that many records, I think everybody wants to say that they wrote the song." Parker later sued Lewis for breaching the confidentiality agreement in a 2001 episode of VH1's Behind the Music by reasserting that Parker stole the song. Regarding his case against Lewis, Parker said, "I got a lot of money out of that." 

In a 2004 article for Premiere magazine, the filmmakers admitted to using the song "I Want a New Drug" as temporary background music in many scenes. They also noted that they had offered to hire Huey Lewis and the News to write the main theme but the band had declined. The filmmakers then gave film footage, with Lewis's song in the background, to Parker to aid him in writing the theme song.

Personnel 
Ray Parker Jr. – vocals, guitar
Louis Johnson – bass
Greg Phillinganes – keyboards, synthesizer
Carlos Vega – drums

Track listing

7-inch Arista / ARI 8391 (US), ARIST 580 (UK) 
Side one
 "Ghostbusters" – 3:46
Side two
 "Ghostbusters" (Instrumental) – 4:07

Charts and certifications
Ray Parker, Jr.'s "Ghostbusters" reached number one on the Billboard Hot 100 chart on August 11, 1984, two months after the film's release, and remained there for three weeks. It spent a total of 21 weeks on the charts.

Weekly charts

Year-end charts

All-time charts

Certifications

Other versions

Run-D.M.C. version

For the soundtrack of the film's 1989 sequel, Ghostbusters II, Run-D.M.C. recorded a hip hop version of "Ghostbusters", featuring new lyrics. It was released on 7-inch vinyl and cassette as a standard single, as well as on 12-inch vinyl and CD as a double A-side maxi single with the track "Pause" from Run-D.M.C.'s fifth studio album, Back from Hell.

Music video
The song's music video begins with Sigourney Weaver and Annie Potts climbing out of a limousine in front of a large crowd, with Run-D.M.C., dressed in the standard beige Ghostbusters' uniform, accompanying them. The group then performs the song on stage to a packed audience for the remainder of the video, intercut with clips from the film. Bill Murray, Dan Aykroyd, and Ernie Hudson also cameo at the beginning of the video as security personnel.

Track listings
7" single / cassette
"Ghostbusters" – 4:07
"Ghostbusters" (Ghost Power Instrumental) – 4:07

12" single
"Ghostbusters" – 6:00
"Ghostbusters" (Dub Buster) – 4:10
"Pause" – 6:00
"Pause" (Dub Version) – 3:32
"Pause" (Radio Version) – 3:46

CD single
"Ghostbusters" – 6:00
"Pause" – 6:00
"Pause" (Dub Version) – 3:32
"Pause" (Radio Version) – 3:46

Charts

The Rasmus version
Finnish rock band The Rasmus recorded a cover of the song which is included on their debut album Peep and EP album 3rd, both from 1996, as well as their compilation album Hellofacollection by 2001.

Mickael Turtle version

In 2005, the original song was covered by the animated character Mickael Turtle, reaching No. 5 in France on December 3, 2005, and No. 23 in Switzerland on January 15, 2006.

Track listing
 "Ghostbusters" (radio edit) – 2:26
 "Ghostbusters" (extended club original mix) – 5:07
 "Ghostbusters" (who's that remix long voix) – 6:15
 "Ghostbusters" (extended club instrumental mix) – 5:07
 "Ghostbusters" (Who's that remix long dub) – 6:12
 Mickael The Turtle – Teaser Video

Charts

Certifications

Fall Out Boy and Missy Elliott version

"Ghostbusters (I'm Not Afraid)", a version of the song by American rock band Fall Out Boy, featuring hip hop recording artist Missy Elliott, was released on June 23, 2016, from the soundtrack of the 2016 reboot Ghostbusters. The cover received negative reviews from critics, who criticized its musical structure.

Walk the Moon version
Another cover version of the song appears on the soundtrack album to the Ghostbusters reboot film. Unlike the very different song first released by Fall Out Boy and Missy Elliott, Walk the Moon's version is much closer to the original song.

Charts

Parodies
Over the years, a handful of local and national businesses across North America and around the world have done parodies of the Ghostbusters theme for advertising or promotional purposes, and used an instrumental version of either the original theme or a remake. The most notable parodies were used by CBS station KMOX-TV (now KMOV) in St. Louis, AutoNation, and the Carpet Mart chain of Central and Lehigh Valley Pennsylvania among others. In the UK, the 118 118 directory assistance telephone service also used the Ghostbusters theme in one of their ads, and featured Ray Parker Jr. performing the parody. In Romania, Automobile Dacia released a television advertisement in 2018 for one of its models, the Duster, accompanied by the song, in an instrumental version, but with people in various costumes singing "Go, Duster!" when in the standard song the chorus says "Ghostbusters!".

American musician and comedian Neil Cicierega uses the song in Bustin, released on his 2017 album Mouth Moods. It takes Parker Jr.'s vocals and edits them to feature many innuendos, most notably by repeating the titular line "Bustin makes me feel good" to use it as slang for ejaculation.

See also
List of Billboard Hot 100 number-one singles of 1984

References

Works cited
Books

External links
 Lyrics of this song
Ray Parker Jr. discusses the making of "Ghostbusters" (archive)
 

1984 songs
1984 singles
1989 singles
1996 singles
2005 singles
Ray Parker Jr. songs
Billboard Hot 100 number-one singles
Cashbox number-one singles
Ghostbusters music
Halloween songs
SNEP Top Singles number-one singles
Number-one singles in France
RPM Top Singles number-one singles
Number-one singles in Spain
Run-DMC songs
The Rasmus songs
Film theme songs
Songs written for films
Songs written by Ray Parker Jr.
MCA Records singles
Profile Records singles
RCA Records singles
Sony Music singles
Universal Records singles
Arista Records singles
Fall Out Boy songs
Missy Elliott songs
Walk the Moon songs
Warner Music Group singles
Electronic rock songs
Songs about ghosts
Songs used as jingles
Songs involved in plagiarism controversies